Taiko may refer to:
 The Japanese word for drum often used to refer to any Japanese drum or drumming music
 a title given to a retired Kampaku regent in Japan—see Sesshō and Kampaku. Commonly refers to Toyotomi Hideyoshi
Chatham Island taiko or Magenta petrel (Pterodroma magentae) bird
Taiko Studios, an independent animation studio founded by Shaofu Zhang
Taiko (ship) a Norwegian roll-on/roll-off (RoRo) freighter
Taiko no Tatsujin, a series of rhythm video games
Taikonaut, a term used in news media for Chinese astronauts
Taikō Yoshio, Japanese sumo wrestler
The novel Taiko: An Epic Novel of War and Glory in Feudal Japan, by Eiji Yoshikawa, translated by William Scott Wilson
Taiko (album), by Danger

See also
Tyco (disambiguation)
Tycho (disambiguation)